The German Institute Taipei (German: Deutsches Institut Taipei); is the overseas representative office of Germany in Taiwan, which promotes the non-diplomatic German-Taiwanese relations and looks after German interests there. Tasks of the institution includes the increasing of bilateral cooperation (especially in the field of culture and economy), dealing with consular affairs like Visa or passport, providing a variety of services for German citizens in Taiwan and German-related information to Taiwanese people. In some instances, it maintains contacts with Taiwanese government on behalf of the Federal Republic of Germany, acting as a de facto embassy. Institute affairs are led by a Director General, who acts as the German representative to Taiwan.

Its counterpart in Germany is the Taipei Representative Office in the Federal Republic of Germany in Berlin.

List of directors general

List of deputy directors general

See also

Foreign relations of Germany
Foreign relations of Taiwan
Foreign policy of Germany
List of diplomatic missions of Germany
List of diplomatic missions in Taiwan
Political status of Taiwan

References

External links
  (in English
  (in English)

2000 establishments in Taiwan
Taipei
Representative Offices in Taipei
Germany–Taiwan relations
Organizations established in 2000